The Strade Bianche is a road bicycle race in Tuscany, Central Italy, starting and finishing in Siena. First held in 2007, it is raced annually on the first or second Saturday of March. The name Strade Bianche (Italian for White Roads) stems from the historic white gravel roads in the Crete Senesi, which are a defining feature of the race. One-third of the total race distance is raced on dirt roads, covering  of strade bianche, spread over 11 sectors.

Despite its short history, the Strade Bianche has quickly gained prestige, and renewed interest in road racing on gravel and dirt roads as a specific skill and discipline. The event is part of the UCI World Tour, cycling's highest level of professional road races. It is organized by RCS Sport – La Gazzetta dello Sport, and is held the weekend before Tirreno–Adriatico as an early spring precursor to the cobbled classics in April. Swiss Fabian Cancellara holds the record with three wins. Also a three-time winner over the pavé of Paris–Roubaix and the cobbled Hilligen of Tour of Flanders, Cancellara rejected comparisons between the races, believing the "white roads" of the Strade "deserved appreciation in their own right". Thibaut Pinot described it as "the sixth Monument" of Classic road cycling because of its iconic parcours, difficulty and prestige.

Since 2015, there has been a women's race, the Strade Bianche Donne, serving as the opening event of the UCI Women's World Tour. It is held on the same day as the men's race, on the same roads but at a shorter distance. Both events start and finish in Siena.

History

Monte Paschi Eroica
L'Eroica Strade Bianche ("Heroic race of the white roads") was created in 1997 as a granfondo (recreational bike race) for vintage bikes only, on the white gravel roads around Siena, an event that is still held on the day after the professional race. The concept was to recreate cycling's so-called "heroic era" from the first half of the 20th century, when most bike races were ridden on dirt or unpaved roads.

In 2007, a professional race was spun off the event, inaugurally called Monte Paschi Eroica, won by Russian Alexandr Kolobnev. The race was held on 9 October; it started in Gaiole in Chianti and finished in Siena. Organizer RCS asked local cycling icons Fiorenzo Magni and Paolo Bettini to promote the maiden event. Monte dei Paschi, the world's oldest still-existing bank with its headquarters in Siena, served as the race's title sponsor for the first four years.

In 2008 it moved to early March on the calendar, closer to the heart of the spring classics season. Swiss Fabian Cancellara won the second edition. In 2009, organizers changed the name of the race to Strade Bianche – Eroica Toscana and in 2010 to Strade Bianche.

Strade Bianche
In 2014, the start of the race moved to the hilly town of San Gimignano. In 2015, its name officially changed to Strade Bianche – Eroica Pro after the creation of a women's version, and UCI upgraded the event to a 1.HC race of the UCI Europe Tour, the highest rating for a non-World Tour single-day cycling event. Since 2016, Siena has hosted both the start and finish of the Strade Bianche. Due to the nature of the race and its place on the calendar, the field is usually made up of riders taking part in Tirreno–Adriatico and Milan–San Remo.

Although a young event, the race gained the status of an "instant classic", garnering much media attention and soon becoming a desirable entry in classics riders' palmares. Among the winners of the first ten editions feature Fabian Cancellara, Philippe Gilbert and Michał Kwiatkowski on a very international roll of honour. Moreno Moser became the first Italian winner of the Strade Bianche in the 2013 race. Classics specialist Cancellara won the tenth edition in 2016, becoming the first three-time winner of the race and earning a gravel sector named after him.

World Tour race
In 2017, the Strade Bianche was included in the UCI World Tour, cycling's highest level of professional races. Michał Kwiatkowski claimed his second victory, becoming the second rider with more than one win.

The 2018 event was raced in abysmal weather. Low temperatures and heavy rainfall had made the gravel roads exceptionally muddy and decimated the peloton in the early stages of the race. Belgian Tiesj Benoot claimed his first professional victory, after he bridged a gap to the race leaders and left them behind on the penultimate gravel sector of Colle Pinzuto. Only 53 of 147 participants finished the race; 20 riders arrived outside of the time limit. Second-place finisher Romain Bardet called the event a "Dante-esque contest".

The 2020 event was postponed to August 1 from its usual March schedule due to the COVID-19 pandemic.

Route

Course
The race starts and finishes in the UNESCO World Heritage Site of Siena. The finish is on Siena's Piazza del Campo, after a steep and narrow climb on the roughly-paved Via Santa Caterina leading into the center of the medieval city.

Gravel roads
The white gravel roads, characteristic of the Tuscan countryside, provide the unique character of the race. They are usually country lanes and farm tracks, called strade bianche or sterrati in Italian, twisting through the hills and vineyards of the Chianti region. The longest and most arduous sectors are the ones in Lucignano d'Asso and Asciano. Some of the dirt roads are flat; other sections include steep climbs and winding descents, testing riders' climbing abilities and bike handling skills. Positioning and route knowledge often prove vital.

Race organizers were inspired by the two most famous northern classics, uniting the peculiarities of the Tour of Flanders with its bergs (short stretches of steep hills), and Paris–Roubaix with its grueling cobblestone sections. It has been called Italy's answer to Flanders' iconic one-day races, as reflected by the promotional slogan of the 2015 edition: La Classica del Nord più a sud d'Europa (Europe's most southern Northern Classic).

Angelo Zomegnan, RCS events director, explained before the first edition in 2007: "Cycling needed something new and the riders need a motivation [...] This race is unique and special." Likewise, Italian sprinter Daniele Bennati was equally enthusiastic about the race, stating: "It was a sensation of turning back in time. I did not think paths like these, where you only see a tractor every now and then, still existed [...] It will be an important race that could become an important classic. I can already imagine the atmosphere of the arrival in the Piazza del Palio."

Winners

Multiple winners

Wins per country

Trivia
 Riders who take three Strade Bianche titles have a sector of gravel road named after them. Fabian Cancellara is the first rider with a stretch named in his honour: sector 8, an  sector in Monte Sante Marie.
 The youngest winner was Moreno Moser in 2013 (22 years and 70 days).
 The oldest winner was Fabian Cancellara in 2016 (34 years and 353 days).
 Three riders – Alessandro Ballan, Peter Sagan and Greg Van Avermaet – finished second on two occasions. None of them have ever won the race.

Strade Bianche Donne

A women's race, the Strade Bianche Donne, was inaugurated in 2015. Part of the UCI Women's World Tour, it is held on the same day as the men's race, on the same roads but at a shorter distance. American Megan Guarnier won the inaugural event in 2015, and Dutch rider Annemiek van Vleuten has won the most editions, winning the 2019 and 2020 races.

References

External links

 

 
UCI World Tour races
UCI Europe Tour races
Cycle races in Italy
Recurring sporting events established in 2007
2007 establishments in Italy